Triathlon at the 2019 African Games was held on 24 and 25 August 2019 in Rabat, Morocco.

Participating nations

Medalists

Medal table

Results

Men's individual 

The men's event was held on 24 August.

Women's individual 

The women's event was held on 24 August.

Mixed relay 

The mixed relay event was held on 25 August.

References

External links 
 Results

2019 African Games
African Games
2019 African Games
Triathlon at the African Games